Richard John Foord (born 13 February 1978) is a British politician and former British Army officer who has served as the Member of Parliament (MP) for Tiverton and Honiton in Devon since 2022. A member of the Liberal Democrats, he won the seat in a by-election held on 23 June 2022, following the resignation due to scandal of the previous Conservative MP Neil Parish.

Early life and education
Foord was born in February 1978  in Weston-super-Mare and went to school in Backwell. He has a BA in history from Royal Holloway, University of London, an MSc in global security from Cranfield University and an MBA from the Open University.

Career before politics
Having attended the Royal Military Academy Sandhurst, Foord was commissioned into the Educational and Training Services Branch of the Adjutant General's Corps of the British Army on 13 April 2001. He was promoted to captain on 13 October 2003. After attending Staff College, he was promoted to major on 31 July 2009. He served in both the Balkans and Iraq, receiving three campaign medals.

Before the election he was International Collaboration and Export Control Manager at the University of Oxford having previously worked at the University of Exeter since 2010, most recently as acting head of global partnerships. He grew up in North Somerset and lived in Yatton for 19 years; by 2017, he lived in Uffculme, Devon.

Political career
Foord stood as the Liberal Democrat candidate for North Somerset in the 2017 general election, reaching third place. He was elected to parliament in the 2022 Tiverton and Honiton by-election. In his victory speech, he made a critique of Boris Johnson's lack of integrity as a leader: "By any measure you are unfit to lead".

In January 2023, Foord tabled his first bill in Parliament to legalise wild camping on Dartmoor National Park. This came in the wake of a High Court ruling which saw the assumed right to wild camp at Dartmoor, established by the 1985 Dartmoor Commons Act, overturned and replaced by an agreement between the Park Authority and local landowners.

Personal life and interests
Foord is married and has three children. He is a member of Sustrans and a qualified mountain leader.

References

External links
 

1978 births
People from Weston-super-Mare
British Army personnel of the Iraq War
Graduates of the Royal Military Academy Sandhurst
Alumni of Royal Holloway, University of London
Alumni of Cranfield University
Alumni of the Open University
People associated with the University of Exeter
People associated with the University of Oxford
Liberal Democrats (UK) MPs for English constituencies
Living people
People from Mid Devon District
People from North Somerset (district)
Royal Army Educational Corps officers
UK MPs 2019–present
Military personnel from Somerset
Graduates of the Staff College, Camberley